Degrassi: The Next Generation is a Canadian teen drama television series created by Linda Schuyler and Yan Moore. The series is now considered the first incarnation and premiered on CTV on October 14, 2001, and then ended on MTV Canada and TeenNick on August 2, 2015. It is the fourth series set in the fictional Degrassi universe created by Schuyler and Kit Hood in 1979. Like its predecessors, Degrassi: The Next Generation follows a group of students from Degrassi Community School, a fictional school in Toronto, Ontario, and depicts some of the typical issues and challenges common to a teenager's life.

The following is a list of characters who have appeared in the television series.

Cast and characters

Main characters 
The following actors have all received star billing and appeared in the opening credits of Degrassi: The Next Generation. 
A regular is an actor who appeared in the opening credits of the show in any given season. In season 6, three actors were credited only for the episodes they appeared in, and in seasons 13–14, all actors are credited only for the episodes in which they appear in.
A recurring character is an actor who does not appear in the opening credits, but appears in several episodes of any particular season.
A guest appearance means that the actor does not appear in the opening credits, but appears in no more than two episodes of any particular season.

Students

Adults

References

 
Degrassi: The Next Generation